Mustang Ridge is a city in Caldwell, Bastrop, and Travis Counties in the U.S. state of  Texas.  The population was 944 at the 2020 census.

Geography

Mustang Ridge is located at  (30.048123, –97.690583).

According to the United States Census Bureau, the city has a total area of 3.8 square miles (9.8 km2), all land.

History
Mustang Ridge was incorporated into a city by Alton Brooks Laws Jr and Charles Laws in 1985 . Alton Brooks Laws was elected the first mayor, municipal judge, and state magistrate . Charles Laws became a source of public controversy when he referred to a proposed detention facility as "a holding pen for wetbacks" on a public agenda.

Demographics

As of the 2020 United States census, there were 944 people, 330 households, and 250 families residing in the city.

As of the census of 2000, 785 people, 256 households, and 214 families resided in the city. The population density was 206.9 people per square mile (80.0/km2). The 274 housing units averaged 72.2/sq mi (27.9/km2). The racial makeup of the city was 67.52% White, 4.08% African American, 2.80% Native American, 0.38% Asian, 22.93% from other races, and 2.29% from two or more races. Hispanics or Latinos of any race were 48.41% of the population.

Of the 256 households, 40.6% had children under the age of 18 living with them, 64.8% were married couples living together, 11.3% had a female householder with no husband present, and 16.4% were not families. About 12.9% of all households were made up of individuals, and 4.7% had someone living alone who was 65 years of age or older. The average household size was 3.07 and the average family size was 3.35.

In the city, the population was distributed as 29.3% under the age of 18, 8.7% from 18 to 24, 31.6% from 25 to 44, 21.4% from 45 to 64, and 9.0% who were 65 years of age or older. The median age was 33 years. For every 100 females, there were 106.0 males. For every 100 females age 18 and over, there were 102.6 males.

The median income for a household in the city was $41,771, and for a family was $46,563. Males had a median income of $31,076 versus $23,182 for females. The per capita income for the city was $15,258. About 5.8% of families and 7.9% of the population were below the poverty line, including 8.9% of those under age 18 and 21.5% of those age 65 or over.

Education
The Travis County portion of Mustang Ridge is served by the Del Valle Independent School District. Creedmoor Elementary School serves this portion. For middle school students are divided between Ojeda Middle School and Del Valle Middle School. High school students are zoned to Del Valle High School.

The Caldwell County portion is served by the Lockhart Independent School District.

The Bastrop Independent School District serves the small portion of Mustang Ridge that lies in Bastrop County.

Law enforcement
The Mustang Ridge Police Department serves the incorporated city.  When the police force is not working, the city is served by the sheriff's offices of Caldwell and Travis Counties.

References

Cities in Travis County, Texas
Cities in Caldwell County, Texas
Cities in Texas
Cities in Greater Austin
Cities in Bastrop County, Texas